The 2013 Crédit Agricole Suisse Open Gstaad was a men's tennis tournament played on outdoor clay courts. It was the 46th edition of the Crédit Agricole Suisse Open Gstaad, and was part of the ATP World Tour 250 Series of the 2013 ATP World Tour. It took place at the Roy Emerson Arena in Gstaad, Switzerland, from 20 July through 28 July 2013.

Singles main draw entrants

Seeds 

 1 Rankings are as of July 15, 2013

Other entrants 
The following players received wildcards into the singles main draw:
  Marco Chiudinelli
  Roger Federer
  Henri Laaksonen

The following players received entry from the qualifying draw:
  Dustin Brown
  Victor Crivoi
  Jan Hernych
  João Souza

Withdrawals
Before the tournament
  Jérémy Chardy
  Nikolay Davydenko
  Benoît Paire (elbow injury)

Retirements
  Roberto Bautista-Agut (back injury)
  Stanislas Wawrinka (low back injury)

Doubles main draw entrants

Seeds 

 Rankings are as of July 15, 2013

Other entrants 
The following pairs received wildcards into the doubles main draw:
  Marco Chiudinelli /  Henri Laaksonen
  Alexander Ritschard /  Alexander Sadecky

Withdrawals
During the tournament
  Roberto Bautista-Agut (back injury)

Finals

Singles 

  Mikhail Youzhny defeated  Robin Haase, 6–3, 6–4

Doubles 

  Jamie Murray /  John Peers defeated  Pablo Andújar /  Guillermo García-López, 6–3, 6–4

References

External links 
 

Credit Agricole Suisse Open Gstaad
Swiss Open (tennis)
2013 Crédit Agricole Suisse Open Gstaad